Bossa nova is a style of samba developed in the late 1950s and early 1960s in Rio de Janeiro, Brazil. It is mainly characterized by a "different beat" that altered the harmonies with the introduction of unconventional chords and an innovative syncopation of traditional samba from a single rhythmic division. The "bossa nova beat" is characteristic of a samba style and not of an autonomous genre.

According to the Brazilian journalist Ruy Castro, the bossa beat – which was created by the drummer Milton Banana – was "an extreme simplification of the beat of the samba school", as if all instruments had been removed and only the tamborim had been preserved. In line with this thesis, musicians such as Baden Powell, Roberto Menescal, and Ronaldo Bôscoli also claim that this beat is related to the tamborim of the samba school. One of the major innovations of bossa nova was the way to synthesize the rhythm of samba on the classical guitar. According to musicologist Gilberto Mendes, the bossa nova was one of the "three rhythmic phases of samba", in which the "bossa beat" had been extracted by João Gilberto from the traditional samba. According to the author Walter Garcia, the synthesis performed by Gilberto's guitar was a reduction of the "batucada" of samba, a stylization produced from one of the percussion instruments: the thumb stylized a surdo; the index, middle and ring fingers phrased like a tamborim.

In 1959, soundtrack to the film "Black Orpheus" (Orpheu Negro) was released, which included the future jazz standard Manhã de Carnaval, "The Morning of the Carnival". The bossa nova wave came to renew samba and to contribute to the modernization of Brazilian music, being a watershed. The style emerged at the time when samba-canção was the dominant rhythm in the Brazilian music scene. Its first appearance was on the album Canção do Amor Demais, in which the singer Elizeth Cardoso recorded two compositions by the duo Antônio Carlos Jobim and Vinicius de Moraes, "Outra Vez" and "Chega de Saudade", which were accompanied by João Gilberto's guitar. It was the first time that the Bahian musician presented the beat of his guitar that would become characteristic of the style. By accompanying Cardoso's voice, Gilberto innovated in the way of pacing the rhythm, accentuating the weak times, in order to carry out a synthesis of the beat of samba to guitar.

In 1959, João Gilberto's bossa album was released, containing the tracks "Chega de Saudade" and "Bim Bom". Considered the landmark of the birth of bossa nova, it also featured Gilberto's innovative way of singing samba, which was inspired by Dorival Caymmi. With the LP Chega de Saudade, released in 1959, Gilberto consolidated the bossa nova as a new style of playing samba. His innovative way of playing and singing samba, combined with the harmonies of Antônio Carlos Jobim and the lyrics of Vinicius de Moraes, found immediate resonance among musicians who were looking for new approaches to samba in Rio de Janeiro, many of them were influenced by American jazz. In 1964 João Gilberto and Stan Getz released "Getz/Gilberto" album. Then, it emerged an artistic movement around Gilberto and others professional artists such as Jobim, Moraes and Baden Powell, among others, which attracted young amateur musicians from the South Zone of Rio – such as Carlos Lyra, Roberto Menescal, Ronaldo Bôscoli and Nara Leão. Jorge Ben wrote "Mas que Nada" in 1963, and Sergio Mendes & Brazil 66 gained bosa rock hit "Mas que Nada" in 1966. It was inducted to the Latin Grammy Hall of Fame. In 1960s, US jazz artists such as Stan Getz, Hank Mobley, Zoot Sims, Paul Winter and Quincy Jones recorded bossa jazz albums.

Etymology

In Brazil, the word  is old-fashioned slang for something done with particular charm, natural flair or innate ability. As early as 1932, Noel Rosa used the word in a samba:

 
 ("Samba, readiness and other  are our things, are things from us.")

The phrase  means literally "new trend" or "new wave" in Portuguese. The exact origin of the term  remained unclear for many decades, according to some authors. Within the artistic beach culture of the late 1950s in Rio de Janeiro, the term  was used to refer to any new "trend" or "fashionable wave". In his book Bossa Nova, Brazilian author Ruy Castro asserts that  was already in use in the 1950s by musicians as a word to characterize someone's knack for playing or singing idiosyncratically. The authorship of the term  is attributed to the then-young journalist Moyses Fuks, who was promoting the event. That group consisted of Sylvia Telles, Carlos Lyra, Nara Leão, Luiz Eça, Roberto Menescal, and others. Mr Fuks's description, fully supported by most of the bossa nova members, simply read  ("Today. Sylvia Telles and a 'Bossa Nova' group"), since Sylvia Telles was the most famous musician in the group at that time. In 1959, Nara Leão also participated in more than one embryonic display of bossa nova. This session was chaired by Carlos Diegues (later a prominent Cinema Novo film director), a law student whom Leão ultimately married.

Instruments

Classical guitar
Bossa nova is most commonly performed on the nylon-string classical guitar, played with the fingers rather than with a pick. Its purest form could be considered unaccompanied guitar with vocals, as created, pioneered, and exemplified by João Gilberto. Even in larger, jazz-like arrangements for groups, there is almost always a guitar that plays the underlying rhythm. Gilberto basically took one of the several rhythmic layers from a samba ensemble, specifically the tamborim, and applied it to the picking hand. According to Brazilian musician Paulo Bitencourt, João Gilberto, known for his eccentricity and obsessed by the idea of finding a new way of playing the guitar, sometimes locked himself in the bathroom, where he played one and the same chord for many hours in a row.

Drums and percussion
As in samba, the surdo plays an ostinato figure on the downbeat of beat one, the "ah" of beat one, the downbeat of beat two and the "ah" of beat two. The clave pattern sounds very similar to the two-three or three-two son clave of Cuban styles such as mambo but is dissimilar in that the "two" side of the clave is pushed by an eighth note. Also important in the percussion section for bossa nova is the cabasa, which plays a steady sixteenth-note pattern. These parts are easily adaptable to the drum set, which makes bossa nova a rather popular Brazilian style for drummers.

Structure
Certain other instrumentations and vocals are also part of the structure of bossa nova:

Bossa nova and samba

Bossa nova has at its core a rhythm based on samba. Samba combines the rhythmic patterns and feel originating in former African slave communities. Samba's emphasis on the second beat carries through to bossa nova (to the degree that it is often notated in 2/4 time). However, unlike samba, bossa nova has no dance steps to accompany it. When played on the guitar, in a simple one-bar pattern, the thumb plays the bass notes on 1 and 2, while the fingers pluck the chords in unison on the two eighth notes of beat one, followed by the second sixteenth note of beat two. Two-measure patterns usually contain a syncopation into the second measure. Overall, the rhythm has a "swaying" feel rather than the "swinging" feel of jazz. As bossa nova composer Carlos Lyra describes it in his song "Influência do Jazz", the samba rhythm moves "side to side" while jazz moves "front to back". Bossa nova was also influenced by the blues, but because the most famous bossa novas lack the 12-bar structure characteristic of classic blues, as well as the statement, repetition and rhyming resolution of lyrics typical of the genre, bossa nova's affinity with the blues often passes unnoticed.

Vocals
Aside from the guitar style, João Gilberto's other innovation was the projection of the singing voice. Prior to bossa nova, Brazilian singers employed brassy, almost operatic styles. Now, the characteristic nasal vocal production of bossa nova is a peculiar trait of the caboclo folk tradition of northeastern Brazil.

Themes and lyrics
The lyrical themes found in bossa nova include women, love, longing, homesickness, nature. Bossa Nova was often apolitical. The musical lyrics of the late 1950s depicted the easy life of the middle to upper-class Brazilians, though the majority of the population was in the working class. In conjunction with political developments of the early 1960s (especially the 1964 military coup d'état), the popularity of bossa nova was eclipsed by Música popular brasileira, a musical genre that appeared around the mid-1960s, featuring lyrics that were more politically charged and focused on the working class struggle.

Dance
Bossa nova was also a fad dance that corresponded to the music. It was introduced in the late 1950s and faded out in the mid-sixties.

Bossa nova music, soft and with sophisticated vocal rhythms and improvisations, is well suited for listening but failed to become dance music despite heavy promotion as yet another dance craze of the 1960s. The style of basic dance steps suited the music well. It was danced on soft knees that allowed for sideways sways with hip motions. It could be danced both solo and in pairs. There were about ten various simple step sentences published. A variant of basic 8-beat pattern was: step forward, tap, step back, step together, repeat from the opposite foot. A  variation of this pattern was a kind of slow samba walk, with "step together" above replaced by "replace". In fact, box steps of rhumba and whisk steps of nightclub two step could be fitted with bossa-nova styling. Embellishments included placing one arm onto one own's belly and waving another arm at waist level in the direction of the sway, possibly with finger click.

Notable bossa nova recordings

Albums
 João Gilberto
 Chega de Saudade (recorded 1959)
 O Amor, o Sorriso e a Flor (recorded 1960)
 Getz/Gilberto with Stan Getz (recorded 18 & 19 March 1963, released 1964)
 Luiz Bonfá
 Luiz Bonfá Plays and Sings Bossa Nova (recorded December, 1962)
 Antônio Carlos Jobim
 The Composer of Desafinado Plays (recorded 9 & 10 May 1963)
 The Wonderful World of Antônio Carlos Jobim (recorded 1965)
 Wave (1967)
 Tide (1970)
 OST "Black Orpheus(Orpheu Negro)", 1959
 Nova — Carlos Lyra — on Phillips, 1960
A Bossa dos Cariocas — Os Cariocas—on Phillips, 1962
 Trio — Tamba Trio—on Phillips, 1962
Big Band Bossa Nova — Oscar Castro Neves—on Audio Fidelity, 1962
News from Brazil Bossa Nova — Eliana & Booker Pitman, 1963
A Bossa Muito Moderna de Donato —J oão Donato—on Polydor, 1963
Baden Powell à Vontade — Baden Powell(Brazil)—on Elenco, 1964
Menina Rica — Carlos Lyra and Dulce Nunes—on CBS, 1964
Zimbo Trio — Zimbo Trio—on RGE, 1964
Entre Nós — Walter Wanderley —on Phillips, 1964
Opinião de Nara — Nara Leão —on Phillips, 1964
 Milton Banana Trio — Milton Banana Trio— on Odeon, 1965
Elis — Elis Regina — on Phillips, 1966

Songs
 Manhã de Carnaval, The morning of the carnival - Luiz Bonfa (1959), From Film "Black Orpheus" (Orpheu Negro)
 The Girl From Ipanema - Astrud Gilberto (1963)
 Frau Gorbatschowa tanzt Bossanova - IFA Wartburg
 Agua de Beber - Astrud Gilberto
 So Nice (Summer Samba) - Astrud Gilberto
 Wave - Antônio Carlos Jobim
 Mas que Nada - Sergio Mendes & Brazil 66 (1966)
 Summer Samba - Walter Wanderley
 One Note Samba - João Gilberto
 Felicidade - Antônio Carlos Jobim
 Desafinado - João Gilberto

See also

 "Blame It on the Bossa Nova" – Eydie Gorme, 1963
 Cha-cha-chá
 Rumba
 Tango music

Notes

References

Sources

Further reading
 Castro, Ruy (transl. by Lysa Salsbury). Bossa Nova: The Story of the Brazilian Music That Seduced the World. 2000. 1st English language edition. A Capella Books, an imprint of Chicago Review Press, Inc.  First published in Brasil by Companhia das Letras. 1990.
 De Stefano, Gildo, Il popolo del samba, La vicenda e i protagonisti della storia della musica popolare brasiliana, Preface by Chico Buarque de Hollanda, Introduction by Gianni Minà, RAI-ERI, Rome 2005, 
 De Stefano, Gildo, Saudade Bossa Nova: musiche, contaminazioni e ritmi del Brasile, Preface by Chico Buarque, Introduction by Gianni Minà, Logisma Editore, Firenze 2017, 
 McGowan, Chris and Pessanha, Ricardo. The Brazilian Sound: Samba, Bossa Nova and the Popular Music of Brazil. 1998. 2nd edition. Temple University Press. 
 Perrone, Charles A. Masters of Contemporary Brazilian Song: MPB 1965–1985. Austin: University of Texas Press, 1989.
 Mei, Giancarlo. Canto Latino: Origine, Evoluzione e Protagonisti della Musica Popolare del Brasile. 2004. Stampa Alternativa-Nuovi Equilibri. Preface by Sergio Bardotti; afterword by Milton Nascimento. (in Italian)

External links

 "It's 20 years ago bossa nova was released to the world at Carnegie Hall in New York" by Rénato Sergio, Manchete magazine, 1982 (in Portuguese)

 
 
Brazilian music
Brazilian styles of music
 
Portuguese words and phrases
1960s in Latin music